Pittefaux is a commune in the Pas-de-Calais department in the Hauts-de-France region of France.

Geography

Population

Places of interest
 The church of St.Louis, dating from the nineteenth century.
 The seventeenth-century chateau of Souverain-Moulin.
 Ruins of a 14th-century castle.
 Two 17th-century manorhouses.

See also
Communes of the Pas-de-Calais department

References

Communes of Pas-de-Calais